The 2008 World's Strongest Man was the 31st edition of World's Strongest Man and was won by Mariusz Pudzianowski from Poland. It was his fifth and record breaking title. Derek Poundstone from the United States finished second, and Dave Ostlund also from the United States finished third after finishing sixth the previous year. The contest was held at Charleston, West Virginia.

Qualifying heats

Heat 1

Heat 2

Heat 3

Heat 4

Heat 5

Final results

References

External links
 Official site

2008 in sports
World's Strongest Man